Upwey is a suburb of Melbourne, Victoria, Australia,  east from Melbourne's central business district, located within the City of Knox and the Shire of Yarra Ranges local government areas.

Upwey South is a colloquial term for the area directly south of the township, but is not an official suburb.

Upwey is bounded by:
North by the suburb of Ferny Creek (Janesleigh Road, Hughes Street)
East by the suburb of Tecoma (Belgrave-Ferny Creek Road, Terrys Avenue)
South by the suburb of Lysterfield (Glenfern Road, McNicol Road and Monbulk Creek)
West by the suburb of Upper Ferntree Gully (New Road, Ferndale Road, Fern Road, Victoria Ridge, Forest View Lane, Wynette Avenue, Old Belgrave Road, Royal Street, Burwood Highway and Mount Dandenong Tourist Road)

Burwood Highway and Glenfern Road are the two main roads that run through Upwey which are connected by Morris Road. These three roads form the main routes around the suburb. Glenfern Road runs along the ridge of the hill providing views across the city and the Lysterfield Valley.

History
Upwey is a residential suburb in hilly surrounds 34 km. east-south-east of Melbourne and 2 km. west of Belgrave. Until the turn of the century Upwey did not have a separate identity. Upwey is a residential suburb in hilly surrounds 34 km. east-south-east of Melbourne and 2 km. west of Belgrave.  Upwey was part of the Parish of Scoresby and the Parish of Narree Worren and as such known by those names during the 1800s. Upwey was known as Mast Gully, after several ship masts had been cut from the gully in 1850. (Mast Gully Creek and Mast Gully Road remain).

Early European settlers 
John Ferguson was the first known white settler in Upwey.  He settled in Upwey (then known as Ferntree Gully) in about 1870.  He was a coach builder with premises in Collins Street and Wellington Parade, and other residential properties in Oakleigh and Elwood.  Together with his three sons John, Samuel and Archibald, he ran cattle on his farm.  He had approximately 600 acres covering the present Upwey township as well as land on both sides of Morris Road and Glenfern Road.  He originally named his homestead Glenlissa, and it was later renamed Quamby and then Glenlucia.  The house is still standing today at 28 Birdwood Avenue. In 1897 three sisters, Misses Tullidge, bought the homestead portion of the Ferguson property.  It was the Tullidge sisters who denoted the area Upwey, after the English village Upwey on the River Wey. They persuaded the Victorian Railways to approve a stopping place near their house, and the name Upwey was given to it. The name was adopted by common usage, the Upwey Church of England being built in 1904 (now in the neighbouring locality of Tecoma).

Henry Morris selected 300 acres between the Monbulk Creek and Ferny Creek with the eastern boundary now being the road named after him, Morris Road. (see 1880 map).  This land was selected possibly as early as 1855, though definitely prior to 1872. He later selected an additional 80 acres of land that adjoining the Monbulk creek and adjacent to today's Birdsland Reserve on 10 January 1872.  Morris called his home View Hill Farm.  Later when it was sold to J Pettigrew in the 1920s, it was renamed Eloera.  The Eloera Homestead can still be seen today at 265 to 269 Glenfern Road.Mr Patrick Callanan selected land in 1867 on the south-west side of today's Morris Road (towards Ferntree Gully) that bounded Ferny Creek to the north and today's Napoleon Road to the south.  (See 1880 map).  Today's Morris Road formed the eastern boundary of the property.  The Monbulk Creek ran through his property, as does today's Lysterfield Road and Glenfern Road.   This property was originally tea-tree swamp land covering the rich creek flats.  He farmed potatoes on the Napoleon Road side of the property.
John Zevenboom purchased 82 acres of crown land in Upwey on 21 March 1876.  He named the property Kooringal.  This property was said to have had $1105 at the time of the sale, also indicating it had probably been occupied prior to purchase.  He originally could only access his property through Callanan's selection.

William Dean purchased 80 acres of crown land on 24 August 1875.  He named the property Forest Park.  It had probably been occupied prior to the purchase date as it was said to have $555 pounds of improvements at the time of the sale.  In 1903, William Dean sold Forest Park to John Griffiths, the Melbourne Team Merchant.  He later purchased further land in the area.  On 17 October 1917, Mr John Griffiths purchased 11 acres of land fronting on to Morris Road and Glenfern Road for 17 pounds an acre.

On 28 November 1925, John Griffith offered Forest Park Estate land subdivision for sale comprising 150 mountain blocks and 17 small farms as well as 1 weekend cottage and 1 Gentleman's cottage. Forest Park Estate had consisted of a homestead and a dam. The original farmstead remains, located on the grounds of the current Upwey South Primary School. The dam was located on Ferny Creek between the current properties at 70 and 72 Hume St and 225 Glenfern Rd. The dam walls broke in the 1980s though the remnants can still be seen. Many blocks in the south of Upwey are part of this Forest Park subdivision, with the houses along Glenfern Road continued to be known by their subdivision lot numbers until the late 1990s. Most of the original buildings date from the 1930s and 1940s from this subdivision which were used as gentleman's cottages and holiday homes.

John Henderson purchased a selection known as Torry Hill that adjoined the Ferny Creek.  He continued to own 40 acres of land on the Torry Hill estate for many years.

In 1878, the government issued a proclamation that excised lands from the Dandenong State Forest.  This proclamation made available 20 acre blocks on the north side of Upwey (today located to the north of the present Burwood Highway).  Mr J Wright of Fitzroy purchased 20 acres between Mast Gully Road and Hughes Road on 26 November 1879.  Father and Son Mr Neil D Whyte and Mr J Whyte purchased three holdings immediately north of the current Upwey township, including the adjoining allotment to Mr Wright.  Their lands included land bounded by Mast Gully Road, Station Avenue and Darling Avenue including the site of the current railway station and high school.  They purchased another holding in 1890 that consisted of the Kookaburra Dell and Argyl Avenue area.  His homestead named Argyle alongside the Ferny Creek and his property boasted a considerable orchard.

Much of the rest of the land was purchased by Dr H St J Clarke, who lived in East Richmond and later Collingwood.  On 26 November 1879, he purchased all the land between today's Hughes St, Earl Street and Mast Gully Road as well as another holding on the south west corner of Mast Gully and Dealbata Roads (later Chapman's Nursery).  A month later on 23 December 1879 he purchased another selection at the junction of Dealbata Road and Hughes Street.

Early land subdivisions and modernisations 
On 18 December 1900, the  narrow gauge railway from Upper Ferntree Gully to Gembrook was opened and they requested the Victorian Railways build a stopping place nearby, which was agreed to and on Monday, 3 June 1901, a station named Upwey was opened. The name was adopted locally, with the Upwey Church of England opening in 1904 and a post office opening on 1 July 1909.

In 1918, the Upwey Convention started holding annual gatherings over the Christmas – New Year period—initially held at the Upwey Union (now Baptist) Church and later moving to their own property next to the High School. When the State Government acquired the land to extend the High School, the Convention moved to Belgrave Heights in 1950.

By the 1920s, both a Progress Association and a fire brigade had been established, and by the end of the 1920s and early 1930s, many weekenders had been built in the area. When the Great Depression occurred, the Victorian Government opened up Dandenong Ranges to housing and the population of Upwey and the surrounding foothills grew steadily. Upwey Primary School opened in 1934 and still exists today. Upwey Higher Elementary School opened in 1937 and became Upwey High School in 1945. Today, it serves as the main secondary education provider in the Dandenong Ranges, taking students from around the foothills and Mount Dandenong.

In 1954, the railway was closed due to a landslide the previous year further along the line past Selby, only to see it reopened as far as Belgrave in 1955 for three years as the first effort to run it as a preserved tourist railway, again closing in 1958. In 1962, the railway from Upper Ferntree Gully to Belgrave was reopened as part of the  broad gauge suburban electric network, giving Upwey a direct link to Melbourne. With the reopening of the railway, the main road (Monbulk Road) no longer crossed the railway next to the station, but continue further on going under a railway bridge. Some years later, Upwey was by-passed with Collier Avenue on the north of the railway being upgraded and renamed Monbulk Road—later to be renamed Burwood Highway. The main street on the south side of the railway became a quiet local shopping strip.

Bushfires 
In 1922, 1938, 1962, 1967, 1969, 1972, 1980, 1983, 1997 and 2009 there were bushfires that affected parts of Upwey.

On Wednesday 19 January 1938, two houses used as weekend holiday homes were lost in Upwey in 1938 from bushfires that started in the mid afternoon and burnt through Ferntree Gully and Upwey in the vicinity of the area around Burwood Highway on the approach between Upper Ferntree Gully to Upwey.

In 1962, serious bushfires burnt through the Dandenong Ranges affecting not only Upwey but also The Basin, Ferny Creek, Ferntree Gully, Sassafras, Olinda Montrose and Kilsyth.

On 8 January 1969, fires broke out around the state. There were serious fires in the Dandenong Ranges that affected Upwey as well as Upper Ferntree Gully, Ferny Creek, The Basin and Sassafras. There were houses lost in Upwey and there are still some evidence of these fires in blackened trees along Glenfern Road on the south side of Morris Road.

There were bushfires in 1972 that burnt through Ferntree Gully National Park at Lysterfield, and also affected Upwey, Ferny Creek, Upper Ferntree Gully, The Basin and Sassafras.

In January 1980, there were bushfires in Ferntree Gully National Park and Upwey burning through the area now known as Glenfern Valley Bushlands.

On the morning of 21 January 1997, the fires began in the foothills of the western face of the ranges. The communities of Ferny Creek, Kalorama, Mount Dandenong and Upwey were affected. Forty-three houses were destroyed and another 45 damaged. Three people lost their lives in the neighbouring It was suspected that the fires in the Dandenongs were deliberately lit.

One week after the devastating Black Saturday bushfires in 2009, a bushfire started near the corner of Nixon Road and Glenfern Road in Upwey in the mid-afternoon.

Contemporary community 
While a suburb of Melbourne, extensive parks, large residential blocks and the lack of commercial activity means that Upwey maintains a rural character. Today, Upwey is a thriving community. Many of the local families have lived in the community for three, four or more generations. These locals will state that Upwey is a small-style rural community, though outsiders have tried to characterise it more as a hippie or bohemian style community. The local schools consist of many children whose grandparents and great-grandparents attended the same school. The community was fairly stable with few people moving in or out of the community until about 2010.  Since then, there has been a rapid turnover in the demographic with many local baby boomers downsizing to smaller blocks and easier to maintain properties in nearby urbanised communities and younger families moving into the area. Newer residents and visitors have claimed that the semi-rural community is a "hipster suburb". It is not a growth area, though, with not a lot of spare land and heavy restrictions to avoid increasing populations due to the risk of bushfire and maintaining the delicate native environment.

There is a significant community activity in Upwey with many local organisations aimed at improving the local environment. These include environmental groups such as the Friends of Glenfern Valley Bushlands, Friends of the Ferny Creek and Friends of the Glenfern Green Wedge. It also includes Upwey Township Group and Project Upwey that are community movements focused on providing local amenities and community activities for locals.

Community spirit is valued in Upwey with initiatives such as Food Is Free food carts located near the Upwey Baptist Church and "Soupies" van who provides free soup to any one who asks once a week from his van in Main Street. Several local restaurants have Pay It Forward tabs to provide meals and support for those in need. During the coronavirus pandemic, Upwey Pizza handed out over 100 free masks that were sewn by a local teenager. A local hobby farm donated over 1300 free eggs during the lockdown period to local families.

Upwey Fire Brigade 
The Upwey Country Fire Authority (CFA) is a volunteer fire service located at the southern end of the Dandenong Ranges. The brigade's area of primary protection includes the township of Upwey, parts of the Dandenong Ranges National Park, farmland, and other areas of bushland both private and public.

Upwey Fire Brigade was established in 1918 and is the oldest of the 15 fire brigades in the Dandenong Ranges.

Upwey Men's Shed 
The Upwey Men's Shed is housed at the old council depot at 213 Glenfern Rd adjacent to the Glenfern Valley Bushlands.

Demographics 
Upwey has a median age of 40 years. Children under 15 years account for 19.1% of the people in Upwey, and people aged over 65 years are 10.7%.

The majority of households in Upwey are family households (78.5%) with single person households representing 19.0% of the households. Only 2.5% of houses are group houses. An average of 2.7 people live in each Upwey household. Couples with children are the predominant household structure in Upwey (50.6%) followed by couples without children (32.8%). Single parent families represent one in six households in Upwey (15.1%) of which 20% are single fathers and 80% are single mothers.

The majority of people living in Upwey were born in Australia (5,269 of the 6,652 or 79.9%). Other responses on the 2016 ABS census were English (5.8%), New Zealand (1.6%), Germany (1%) and Netherlands (0.9%). Over 55% of people living in Upwey had both parents born in Australia (55.3%) and only one quarter had both parents born oversees (22.7%). For people who had their parents born overseas, the top countries listed were England, New Zealand, Netherlands and Germany. Over 90% of households in Upwey only speak English at home.

Almost all houses in Upwey are separate houses (98.6%) and most are occupied private dwellings (93.4%) with the remaining 6.6% being unoccupied private dwellings. Most of these dwellings (46.5%) are three-bedroom houses with 4 bedrooms (38.8%) and 2 bedrooms (11.7%) also common. One-third (33%) of houses in Upwey are owned outright and occupied by the owner, with another 55% of houses owned with a mortgage and occupied by the owner. Only 10.6% of houses are rented. The median household income is $1773 per week. The ABS rates Upwey as in the top quintile (83rd percentile) in terms of relative socio-economic advantage and disadvantage compared to other areas in Australia. In other words, 83% of Australia's suburbs are more disadvantaged and less advantaged than those people who live in Upwey.

Township 
Main Street boasts a wide variety of shops and services, instilling a traditional community village nature into an outer eastern suburb of Melbourne. Main Street consists of small retail outlets including a music shop, health care shop and milk bar as well as health care services including physiotherapy, osteopathy, dental and medical centre.

The predominant businesses are small cafes and restaurants providing a strong food culture to the township as these businesses are generally popular with a range of eat in and takeaway services with a prominent curbside dining culture. Upwey Main Street is home to a range of pizza, woodfire, tapas, Indian, Thai, Chinese, fish and chip, bakeries and cafés.

In 1998, the first metropolitan and third ever Community Bank branch of Bendigo Bank was established in Upwey Main Street.  This community banking model returns branch profits into the community.

Community spaces and public lands 
There are substantial crown land and recreational reserves in Upwey. The Burrinja Cultural Centre on Glenfern Road, Forest Park Reserve, Ferny Creek Reserve (also known as the Hume St Drainage Reserve), Upwey South Recreational Reserve (including tennis courts), Upwey Recreational Reserve (including the bowls clubs) and Glenfern Valley Bushlands all form public reserves and recreational areas.

At Main Street, there is also a skate park and public halls. The public halls are located behind the retail outlets on Main Street. This group of public halls house community organisations including the Upwey Senior Community Centre, University of the Third Age, Upwey Angling Club, Upwey Scouts, and the Upwey Girl Guides. The buildings are available for hire. On the other side of Burwood Highway, the Upwey Community Centre also provides a location for community events, located opposite the Upwey RSL.

The Ringwood-Belgrave Rail Trail passes through the Upwey township.

Other significant areas adjoin Upwey including Birdsland Reserve and the Dandenong Ranges National Park.

Children's playgrounds 
There are children's playgrounds at Kooringal Playground on Kooringal Road, Burrinja Cultural Centre on Glenfern Road, Main Street Upwey, Wright Avenue Playground and at Upwey South Recreational Reserve.

Farming community 
Glenfern Road is home to prominent agricultural landscape. The area surrounding Glenfern Road is a significant urban agricultural region less than 35 km of Melbourne. With the advantage of the rich volcanic soils, the area in Upwey around Glenfern Road is home to the Lysterfield Valley fertile Monbulk Creek zone that consists of approximately 700 hectares of hobby farms, market farms and significant agricultural holdings of market gardens, cattle and sheep and poultry farms. These agricultural holdings are on the southern side of Upwey Village.

There are many semi-rural or rural style businesses in the area.

Culture
Upwey is home to a thriving cultural scene for live theatre and music. Notable examples are the "Dandenong Ranges Music Centre" co-located at the Upwey High School and the "Burrinja Cultural Centre" located at the site of the offices of the former Shire of Sherbrooke on Glenfern Road. The Burrinja Cultural Centre houses an art gallery and café. It is a prominent venue for hire and site of live music and theatre.

The Mountain District Radio station 3MDR community radio station broadcasts from its studio located at the historical Forest Park Homestead on the grounds of the Upwey South Primary School.

Community events

The local scouts group sell Christmas Trees annually in December.

Sporting clubs
Together with its neighbouring township Tecoma, Upwey has multiple sporting teams. The Upwey TecomaAustralian Rules football team (Upwey-Tecoma) competes in the Yarra Valley Mountain District Football League. Other local sports clubs are the Upwey-Tecoma Netball Club, Upwey Tecoma Bowls Club, Upwey Tecoma Cricket Club, and Upwey-Tecoma Tennis Club. Upwey South hosts the Upwey South Netball Club and the Upwey South Tennis Club.

The Upwey - Tecoma Community Recreational and Sporting Hub - known as the UT Crash - provides significant sporting facilities including the Andrew Petersen Pavilion located on the Upwey High School grounds.

Religious organisations 
The Upwey Baptist Community Church, Holy Trinity Anglican Church, Tumbetin Spiritual Centre and Buddhist Discussion Centre are located in Upwey.

Transport 

Upwey is on the Belgrave Railway line. It has one railway station which is located adjacent to Main Street, Upwey's main shopping strip.

The bus route 693 which runs from Belgrave to Oakleigh via Burwood Highway and Ferntree Gully Road runs through the suburb.

The bus route 699 runs from Belgrave to Upwey and travels around Upwey and neighboring suburbs.

Education
Upwey has two pre-schools called Upwey South Pre-School and Upwey Pre-School.  Similarly, there are two primary schools in Upwey known as Upwey Primary School and Upwey South Primary School.

There is one secondary school in Upwey—Upwey High School, a government school for years 7–12.

Victorian Heritage Listed Properties

National Trust 
 Belmont Tower - 32 Belmont Avenue oldest-known wooden lookout tower in Victoria
 Lysterfield Valley - Lysterfield Valley is located south-west of the Dandenong Ranges. The boundaries follow Napoleon Road, Ferny Creek, Glenfern and Kelletts Road and are contiguous with a section of the boundary of the Recorded Lysterfield Forest area.

Yarra Ranges Shire 
 Eloera Homestead at 265 to 269 Glenfern Road  - Built by one of the area's selectors. It is an example of a largely intact nineteenth century gothic homestead.
 Chitt's property at 322 Glenfern Road - An allotment selected by the Morris family. It is a rare example of a surviving farm complex. It was later used as a market garden by the prominent Chitts family.
 Forest Park Homestead and Stables at 91 Morris Road (corner of Riley Road). One of the region's oldest and most elaborate houses. The stables coachhouse and garden gazebo remain in excellent condition.
 Hillside- house and garden at 1-5 Hillside Grove
 Allawah at 10 St Kilda Avenue Allawah has State significance as the place where in the 1960s the artist Fred Williams was living while he created his Upwey paintings
 Magpie Milk Bar at 48-50 Main Street The former Magpie Cafe, a two-storey shop/residence, has high local significance as an important township building, part of the Upwey shopping centre townscape from the mid-1920s or earlier.
 The Former McNally Real Estate Offices McNally Real Estate Offices (former), built by Phillips and Nicholson in 1920, have high local significance for their association with the development of Upwey township after the First World War.
 Glenlucia Homestead (Glenlissa /Quamby) at 28 Birdwood Avenue One of the region's oldest houses, in excellent condition with minimal alterations
 Mangoolah Homestead at 86 - 90 Main Street
 Mast Gully Track and Gully at 71-73 Mast Gully Road and 3 Elliott Road Mast Gully has high local significance as a place associated with an expedition to cut urgently needed ship's masts, from which the gully gained its name.

Victorian War Heritage Inventory 
 Upwey Memorial Wall at Mast Gully Road
 Upwey Primary School War Memorial at Upwey Primary School
 Belgrave State School Honour Roll (First World War) at 1 Mast Gully Road

Significant properties 
The designer and architect Alistair Knox designed two mudbrick houses in Upwey.

Notable citizens

Athletes and sports personalities
 Shae Sloane An AFLW footballer.
 Rory Sloane Current co-captain of the Adelaide Football Club
 Penny Taylor A retired professional basketball player 
 Fred Birnstihl AFL footballer
 Ross Dunne AFL footballer

Media, journalism, performance and artists 
 Peter McArthur Media personality and politician
 Red Symons– Musician and media personality, attended Upwey High School
 Julian Assange
 Jane Hall Actress
 Fred Williams
 Harley Bonner

Politicians
 Tammy Lobato An Australian politician for the Labor Party
 Roy Rawson An Australian politician
 Hurtle Lupton Australian politician

Natural environment and bushlands 
The Glenfern Valley Bushlands are located on Glenfern Road. The Bushlands provide native remnant and rehabilitated forest.  It descending from the ridge into the valley and a walk along Ferny Creek. Glenfern Valley Bushlands comprises 40 hectares or 100 acres, 35 km east of Melbourne. It is bounded on the south by Glenfern Road, on the west by New Road, the north boundary is Ferny Creek and the eastern boundary is 'Depot Track'. The land falls gently from south to north, with Grassy Forest and Herb Rich Foothill Forest on high ground to Riparian Forest at the creek line. It is in the Southern Fall Bioregion, and contains a large area of remnant vegetation.  This land is now Crown Land under management by Department of Sustainability & Environment and the Shire of Yarra Ranges. It is being rehabilitated by Friends of Glenfern Valley Bushlands - a volunteer group of interested local people who weed and plant in the park on a monthly basis.

Flora and biodiversity 
Upwey contains a wide range of microclimates and aspects, and as a result the flora is similar to that of the larger Dandenong Ranges as a whole.

Weeds remain a significant threat to biodiversity, with significant infestations of Ivy, onion weed, tradescantia and holly.[4] A number of conservation groups are active in the local area including the Friends of Ferny Creek and Friends of Glenfern Valley.

Outside of the conservation zones and bushlands, Upwey is largely covered by exotic vegetation with remnant native trees.

Creeks and waterways 
Upwey has three main creeks, Ferny Creek, Monbulk Creek and Mast Gully Creek. These two creeks are part of the Corhanwarrabul catchment.  The Corhanwarrabul catchment is part of the larger Dandenong Creek catchment, that flows into Port Phillip at Patterson Lakes. Ferny Creek starts in the Dandenong Ranges near the suburb of Sherbrooke. The headwaters are located in the Tremont/Ferny Creek region on Mt Dandenong of the Dandenong Ranges. It flows through the suburbs of Upwey, Upper Ferntree Gully, Ferntree Gully and Rowville.  Ferny Creek and Monbulk Creek join in Rowville after which this combined waterway is known as Corhanwarrabul Creek.  Monbulk Creek runs through the Lysterfield Valley to the south of the Glenfern Road ridge. The Corhanwarrabul Creek later becomes the Dandenong Creek at Police Road. Monbulk Creek flows through the suburbs of Belgrave, Upwey, Lysterfield, Ferntree Gully and Rowville with the headwaters rising in the Sherbrooke Forest National Park.

Ferny Creek 

A Melbourne Water Corporation report in 1998 on the Health of Corhanwarrabul, Monbulk and Ferny Creek contained a thorough report on the quality and health of the waterways.  The report found Ferny Creek had fluoride concentrations three times higher than other local creeks (Monbulk Creek, Ferntree Gully Creek and Celamtis Creek).  This finding suggested that approximately one-third of the water flowing through Ferny Creek comes from fluoridated domestic water including runoff from watering gardens, household greywater and runoff from septic systems. E Coli levels in Ferny Creek were higher than in other local creeks, again suggesting there may be runoff from domestic septic systems. Although much of the area is connected to the main sewerage system, a small section of upper Ferny Creek upstream of Tecoma and in Upwey along Glenfern Road are not connected to the main sewerage system and instead use domestic septic tanks, many which are older original systems.

The water quality of Ferny Creek deteriorates as it flows through Upwey. It is rated as good at Sophia Grove but by the time it reached New Road on the west border of Upwey, Ferny Creek quality was rated very poor to fair. Although other local creeks including the Monbulk Creek are excellent habitat for platypus and platypus is sited, there have been no platypus sightings in Ferny Creek.

The majority of Ferny Creek is degraded and suffering from severe bank erosion.  The large rural residential blocks on Glenfern Road to the west of Morris Road running down towards the Glenfern Valley Bushlands have predominantly partnered with Melbourne Water to undertake rehabilitation of the Ferny Creek undertaking weed reduction and erosion.  There had been a man-made dam dug into Ferny Creek prior to the subdivision of the town in the 1920s. Although this dam collapsed in the 1980s, the residual erosion and stream bed degradation to the waterway remains substantial and affects the waterway rehabilitation.

See also
 Shire of Sherbrooke – Upwey was previously within this former local government area.
 Shire of Yarra Ranges – Upwey is within this local government area.
 Upwey railway station, Melbourne
 Ringwood–Belgrave Rail Trail
 3MDR
 Burwood Highway

References

External links
 Extract of Suburbs In Time

Suburbs of Melbourne
Suburbs of Yarra Ranges